Çandarlı may mean

Place

Çandarlı, a town in İzmir Province, Turkey

People

Çandarlı Kara Halil Hayreddin Pasha  Ottoman Grand vizier 1364-1387
Çandarlı Ali Paşa Ottoman Grand vizier (1387-1406)
Çandarlı (1.) İbrahim Paşa Ottoman Grand vizier  (1421-1429)
Çandarlı (2nd) Halil Pasha Ottoman Grand vizier  (1439-1453)
Çandarlı (2.) İbrahim Paşa Ottoman Grand vizier  (1498-1499)